Aaron Marquez Miles (born April 13, 1983) is an American basketball coach and former player currently working as an assistant coach for the Boston Celtics of the National Basketball Association (NBA). He played college basketball for the Kansas Jayhawks and had a brief stint in the National Basketball Association (NBA) with the Golden State Warriors. Miles was previously an assistant coach for the Florida Gulf Coast Eagles and a head coach for the Santa Cruz Warriors of the NBA G League. In 2019, he was hired as a player development coach with the Golden State Warriors.

High school career
Miles played for the Jefferson Democrats in northeast Portland. The Democrats won the 2000 4A Oregon state championship, beating Tualatin 58–44, and capping a 28–0 season. The Democrats finished the year with a No. 4 national ranking and several other players went on to play in college, such as Michael Lee (Kansas), Thomas Gardner (Missouri), and Brandon Brooks (USC).

College career
After being named the Oregon 4A High School basketball player of the year as well as McDonald's Morgan Wooten National Player of the Year, Miles attended the University of Kansas, where he starred at the point guard position for the Kansas Jayhawks men's basketball team. He helped lead the Jayhawks to two consecutive Final Four appearances in 2002 and 2003 and an appearance in the 2003 national championship game. He is the all-time assists leader (with 954 career assists) of both Kansas and the Big 12 Conference. He was named to the All-Big 12 Team in both 2004 and 2005.

He was also named to the All-Big 12 Defensive Team three times and he finished his college career, in eighth place in NCAA history in assists  and in second place all-time in Kansas history in steals.

Professional career

NBA (2005–2006)
Miles signed in September 2005, as an undrafted rookie free agent with the NBA's Golden State Warriors for the 2005–06 season, but was released in January 2006, before his contract became guaranteed. He played for the Fort Worth Flyers in the NBA Development League for the remainder of that season where he played with his Kansas teammate Keith Langford.

Europe (2006–2010)
He signed for the 2006–07 season with the French League club Élan Béarnais Pau-Orthez, a team that played in the Euroleague that season, and won the French National Cup championship that year. He played with the Spanish ACB club Cajasol Sevilla in the 2007–08 season.

In August 2008, Miles joined one of the three Euroleague teams from the Greek League for the 2008–09 season, Panionios. In October 2009, he signed with another Greek team Aris BC for the 2009–10 season.

Return to America (2010–2011)
In 2010, Miles joined the try-outs for the Warriors, but was released days before the start of the season. He signed with the Reno Bighorns. He was sent to the Bakersfield Jam, but was quickly waived due to injury.

Back to Europe (2011–2015)
Miles returned to Europe in August 2011, when he signed with BC Krasnye Krylya. In 2012 and 2013, he won the Russian Cup with Krasnye, in the second he was named Finals MVP. With the team, he also won the 2012–13 FIBA EuroChallenge. In July 2014, he left Krasnye Krylya.

On July 9, 2014, Miles signed a one-year deal with Lokomotiv Kuban.

Coaching career

College coaching career (2015-2017) 
Following his career as a player, Miles was hired at the University of Kansas as assistant director of student-athlete development for the 2015–16 season. The following year, he accepted a position as assistant coach at Florida Gulf Coast University under head coach Joe Dooley, a former coach of Miles at Kansas.

Santa Cruz Warriors / Golden State Warriors (2017-2021) 
On August 10, 2017, Miles was named head coach of the Santa Cruz Warriors, the NBA G League developmental team of the Golden State Warriors. After two seasons, he was promoted to staff with Golden State as a player development coach.

Boston Celtics (2021-present) 
In the summer of 2021, Miles was hired as an assistant coach by the Boston Celtics

Statistics

Regular season

|-
|-
| style="text-align:left;"| 2010–11
| style="text-align:left;"|  Reno Bighorns
| align=center | D-League
| 17 || 34.5 || .511 || .000|| .786 || 4.1 || 8.8 || 2.5 || 0.2 || 15.1
|-
| rowspan=2 style="text-align:left;"| 2011–12
| rowspan=2 style="text-align:left;"|  BC Krasnye Krylya
| align=center | PBL
| 17 || 31.5 || .413 || .500|| .845 || 3.9 || 6.0 || 1.4 || 0.2 || 8.6
|-
| align=center | VTB United
| 16 || 33.1 || .487 || .300|| .746 || 4.3 || 3.8 || 2.5 || 0.2 || 10.8
|-
| rowspan=2 style="text-align:left;"| 2012–13
| rowspan=2 style="text-align:left;"|  BC Krasnye Krylya
| align=center | PBL
| 17 || 32.1 || .391 || .154|| .811 || 3.8 || 5.6 || 1.9 || 0.1 || 8.5
|-
| align=center | VTB United
| 18 || 34.6 || .423 || .158|| .831 || 4.2 || 7.3 || 2.2 || 0.1 || 10.2
|-
|}

See also

 List of NCAA Division I men's basketball career assists leaders

References

External links

Euroleague.net Profile
NBA Draft Bio
Eurobasket.com Profile
Draftexpress.com Profile
FIBA.com Profile
VTB United League Profile
Hired by KU

1983 births
Living people
African-American basketball players
American expatriate basketball people in France
American expatriate basketball people in Greece
American expatriate basketball people in Russia
American expatriate basketball people in Spain
Aris B.C. players
Basketball coaches from Oregon
Basketball players from Portland, Oregon
American men's basketball players
BC Krasnye Krylia players
Élan Béarnais players
Florida Gulf Coast Eagles men's basketball coaches
Fort Worth Flyers players
Golden State Warriors players
Greek Basket League players
Jefferson High School (Portland, Oregon) alumni
Kansas Jayhawks men's basketball coaches
Kansas Jayhawks men's basketball players
Liga ACB players
McDonald's High School All-Americans
Parade High School All-Americans (boys' basketball)
Panionios B.C. players
PBC Lokomotiv-Kuban players
Point guards
Real Betis Baloncesto players
Reno Bighorns players
Santa Cruz Warriors coaches
Sportspeople from Portland, Oregon
Undrafted National Basketball Association players
21st-century African-American sportspeople
20th-century African-American people